Stefan Dennis (born 30 October 1958) is an Australian actor and singer best known for playing the role of cold-hearted and ruthless businessman Paul Robinson in the soap opera Neighbours from its first episode on March 18, 1985. He departed Neighbours in 1992 before returning for a short stint in 1993. He then returned in late 2004 and played the character up until the show's temporary ending in 2022 and is set to return to the role in 2023. During his time away from Neighbours he was a cast member of Scottish soap opera River City produced and set in Glasgow, Scotland. He is also known for his 1989 single "Don't It Make You Feel Good", which reached Number 16 in the Irish and UK Singles Chart.

Early life
Dennis was born in Tawonga, Victoria but his family moved to Queensland for 12 years, where he did most of his schooling. He started showing his genuine interest in music and acting at the age of seven and was eleven years old when he started in amateur theatre in Queensland. His debut with this first theatre company was in Oliver!. Also, at this time he and his brother formed a vocal duo and performed on many occasions. They played at weddings, charity events, and some large concerts.

By the age of 14, Dennis was convinced he wanted to go into the entertainment business. He understood the pitfalls associated with choosing the career of an entertainer, so he decided to get a trade behind him to support him through the times when he might be out of work. He left school at 15 and took an apprenticeship as a chef. On completion of his chef's certificate, he moved from the Gold Coast to Melbourne.

Career
Dennis started out in guest roles on programmes such as Cop Shop, Skyways, Carson's Law, Young Ramsay, Prisoner, Home, The Henderson Kids, The Sullivans, The Young Doctors and Sons and Daughters and many others. Dennis has a number of credits to his name. He had a major role in The Henderson Kids, a co-lead in an ABC children's show called Infinity Limited, and he co-starred in The Flying Doctors mini-series. In 1984, he auditioned for the roles of Shane Ramsay and Des Clarke in a new soap opera, Neighbours where he was later cast as Paul Robinson instead. His role in Neighbours brought opportunities such as appearing at the Royal Variety Performance alongside fellow cast members.

After finishing Neighbours in 1992, Dennis moved to the UK and worked on a variety of TV shows and theatre productions. He appeared in many pantomimes, plays, and musicals including the pantomime Cinderella in Bournemouth, UK from 10 December 1992 to 17 January 1993. In 1994, he played Mickey in Blood Brothers, touring in New Zealand and Australia before returning to the UK to appear in the show in both the West End, and in a national tour of the UK. He appeared in many television shows, including Dream Team, River City, The Bill and Casualty. He also returned to Australia from time to time for guest roles in shows such as Blue Heelers, Good Guys Bad Guys and Stingers. Dennis has worked as a voiceover artist for many years both in Australia and the UK.

He was part of the team that set a new world record in 1995 for 24-hour endurance outdoor karting. While in the UK, Dennis became a partner in Lex Film Entertainment, and was associate producer on the film The Truth About Love.

He returned to Neighbours at the end of 2004, and continued as a regular character until the show's final episode in 2022. He is the only current cast member who appeared in the first episode, although he is not the longest serving due to his long break. Of his role in Neighbours, Dennis has said that people struggle to tell the difference between himself and the character and "shy away" from him because "they think I'm going to bark at them". He has conceded that it could be a testament to his acting and says "It's a real compliment though, as people know the character that well, they actually think I am like him in real life". As a matter of fact, although he portrays Paul Robinson as having a prosthetic leg, he has two good legs of his own.

In 2009, Dennis was stalked by two fans while presenting the Best Villain award at the British Soap Awards. He hosted a documentary special celebrating Neighbours 30th anniversary titled Neighbours 30th: The Stars Reunite, which aired in Australia and the UK in March 2015. In 2018, Dennis appeared in the recurring role of Michael Armstrong QC in the sixth series of Wentworth.

Music
In 1989, Dennis started a side-line music career, and released the single "Don't It Make You Feel Good", which reached No. 16 in the UK Singles Chart, in May of that year. He released a second single, "This Love Affair", which reached No. 67 in the UK in October 1989. Dennis is a talented pipe organist.(cite Australian Organist Association 1990 march)

In 2013, Dennis sang and appeared as Santa Claus in the music video for his Neighbours co-star Alan Fletcher's song "If You Want a Happy Christmas".

Personal life
Dennis' older brother, John, was killed by a drunk driver at the age of 12. Of the sentencing, Dennis has said: "That driver was fined just $50 for what he did. And that same weekend someone who killed a koala at Currumbin Wildlife Sanctuary got fined $200. So... well, that's hard." Dennis has used the incident to raise awareness about drink driving via his Twitter account.

Dennis previously dated Natalie Imbruglia and Gayle Blakeney in the 90s while they were co-starring on Neighbours with him.

He met and married his wife, Gail when in the U.K. The couple have two sons, Cameron and Declan, and a daughter Darci. The family are now back living in Australia.

Filmography

Television

Films

Theatre

References

External links
 Official Stefan Dennis Website
 
 Photographs of Dennis as Paul Robinson

Australian male film actors
Australian male musical theatre actors
Australian male soap opera actors
Male actors from Victoria (Australia)
Living people
1958 births
20th-century Australian male actors
21st-century Australian male actors
20th-century Australian male singers
21st-century Australian male singers